William Cordell Witherspoon (born August 19, 1980) is a former American football linebacker. He was drafted by the Carolina Panthers in the third round of the 2002 NFL Draft. He played college football at Georgia. Professionally, he played for the St. Louis Rams, Philadelphia Eagles and Tennessee Titans.

Early years
Witherspoon's father served in the US Air Force, and so Witherspoon moved around as a child. However, his family never lived on the military bases, instead deciding to live in the community so the children could experience the culture. In addition to speaking English, he knows how to speak German, and is learning both Arabic and Swedish.  He attended Good Shepherd Lutheran School in middle school. He played running back for Rutherford High School in Panama City, Florida, but switched to linebacker before his senior year. He was chosen as the USA Today Florida Player of the Year for his efforts as a senior, where he posted 112 tackles, 3 sacks, and three interceptions.

Witherspoon and his wife Rebecca have three daughters.

College career
He played college football at the University of Georgia, where he was a starter for three years. After playing every game as a true freshman, he started most of the Bulldogs' games for the remainder of his time at Georgia, switching between the middle, strong-side, and weak-side linebacker positions. He graduated with 211 tackles, 3.5 sacks, one forced fumble, and one fumble recovery. He was a landscape architecture major.

Professional career

Pre-draft measurables

Carolina Panthers
Witherspoon was drafted by the Carolina Panthers in the third round (73rd overall) of the 2002 NFL Draft. He  was the latest addition to new coach John Fox's overhaul of the defense, and Witherspoon's versatility at linebacker helped the Panthers total the second-best defense in the league. He replaced Dan Morgan at middle linebacker halfway through the season after Morgan went down with injury. He finished the season with 71 tackles and 1.5 sacks, his first half sack coming at the Cleveland Browns on December 1. During the 2003 NFL season, Witherspoon was the only Panther linebacker to start every game, where he once again filled in for an injured Morgan at middle linebacker.

He intercepted his first pass off New Orleans Saints quarterback Aaron Brooks. During Super Bowl XXXVIII, Witherspoon posted a career-high 16 tackles. He ended the campaign with a total of 99 tackles, one sack and one interception. The following year, "Spoon" was one of the few defensive players to start every game for the Panthers, who were wracked with injuries. Despite the loss of key personnel like defensive tackle Kris Jenkins, the Panthers led the league in interceptions. Witherspoon set personal bests with three sacks and four interceptions and a then career-high of 103 tackles. In 2005, his final year with the Panthers, Witherspoon played in 15 games and finished the season 81 tackles, 2.5 sacks and two interceptions.

St. Louis Rams
On March 12, 2006, as an unrestricted free agent, he signed a six-year, $33 million contract (including $15 million guaranteed) with the St. Louis Rams In his first season (2006) with the Rams, he played in all 16 games and recorded a career-high 113 tackles and three sacks. In 2007, he recorded 110 tackles and a career-high seven sacks and was named Team MVP for 2007.

Philadelphia Eagles
On October 20, 2009 Witherspoon was traded from the Rams to the Philadelphia Eagles in exchange for wide receiver Brandon Gibson and a fifth round draft pick in 2010. In his first game as an Eagle against the Washington Redskins on October 26, 2009, he recorded six tackles, an interception (returned for a touchdown), sack, and a forced fumble.  During the season, he played in 17 games, becoming the fifth player since bye weeks were reintroduced in 1990 to do so, as he was traded prior to St. Louis's bye week to the Eagles after the Eagles bye week.

He was released on March 5, 2010.

Tennessee Titans
Witherspoon was signed by the Tennessee Titans on March 9, 2010. He was voted by his teammates as the Titans Ed Block Courage Award recipient

Second stint with Rams
On July 18, 2013, Witherspoon signed with the St. Louis Rams.

After football
After not being signed by any team in the 2013-2014 off season, Witherspoon announced his retirement and took a job as the St. Louis Rams sideline reporter for Rams Radio Network.

Personal life
Witherspoon owns the sustainable Shire Gate Farm near Owensville, MO.

References

External links
 St. Louis Rams profile

1980 births
Living people
American football linebackers
Carolina Panthers players
Georgia Bulldogs football players
St. Louis Rams players
Philadelphia Eagles players
Tennessee Titans players
Players of American football from San Antonio
African-American players of American football
21st-century African-American sportspeople
20th-century African-American people
Ed Block Courage Award recipients